There are two things named Ahtanum in the U.S. state of Washington:
Ahtanum, Washington (town)
Ahtanum View Correction Center (state prison)